St. Luke's Chapel may refer to:

St. Luke's Chapel (Sewanee), located on the campus of Sewanee: The University of the South in Sewanee, Tennessee
St. Luke's Chapel (Stamford, Connecticut), listed on the NRHP in Connecticut
St. Luke's Chapel (Rutherfordton, North Carolina), listed on the NRHP in North Carolina
St. Luke's Chapel, Oulu, a church in Oulu, Finland.

See also
St. Luke's Church (disambiguation)